Burnell is a surname. Notable people with the surname include:

 Alf Burnell (born 1924), English rugby player
 Arthur Coke Burnell (1840–1882), British translator
 Barker Burnell (1798–1843), U.S. Representative from Massachusetts
 Cassandra Burnell Southwick (c. 1600–1660), English American Quaker
 Charles Burnell (1876–1969), British rower
 Jocelyn Bell Burnell (born 1943), Northern Irish astrophysicist
 Joe Burnell (born 1980), English footballer
 Paul Burnell (born 1965), Scottish rugby player
 Robert Burnell (1239–1292), English bishop

See also
Burnell-Nugent